Maria Cristina Bernardo Vaqueiro Rodrigues (born 4 June 1971) is a Brazilian former long-distance runner. She won three gold medals at the South American Championships in Athletics, winning a 5000 metres/10,000 metres double in 2001, then retaining her 5000 m title at the 2003 championships.

Rodrigues has twice represented Brazil at the IAAF World Cross Country Championships (1999 and 2000) and participated at the 2006 IAAF World Road Running Championships. She also won international medals at the Ibero-American Championships in Athletics (10,000 m bronze in 2000) and the South American Cross Country Championships (silver in 1999).

She was the Brazilian champion in the 5000 m in 2003.

International competitions

National titles
Brazilian Athletics Championships
5000 metres: 2003

References

External links



Living people
1971 births
Brazilian female long-distance runners
21st-century Brazilian women
20th-century Brazilian women